Probable carboxypeptidase X1 is an enzyme that in humans is encoded by the CPXM1 gene.

The protein encoded by this gene is a member of the M14 family of zinc carboxypeptidases; however, the protein has no detectable carboxypeptidase activity. The encoded protein is thought to be an extracellular and/or membrane protein, and may be involved in cell-cell interactions.

References

External links

Further reading